is a former Japanese football player.

Playing career
Homma was born in Tainai on 19 April 1981. He began to play youth team football at the age of 8, with Nakajo Junior Soccer Club. In 1997, he entered Narashino High School in Chiba Prefecture and chose to play for the school. His school team won the prefectural tournament in 1998.

Homma began his professional career with Albirex Niigata in 2000. He made his professional debut on 5 May 2000, in a J2 League match against Mito HollyHock. Three days later, he scored his first professional goal in a 2–1 away victory over Shonan Bellmare. Homma finished his rookie campaign with 31 total appearances and three goals. However, he spent the next few years trying to break into the first team, spending most of his time as a substitute.

In the 2009 season, he was one of the most important players of Jun Suzuki's team. As the team usually deployed a 4–3–3 formation, he usually played as a central/defensive midfielder. He succeeded in retaining his place in the team, making 42 total appearances in the 2009 season.

At the start of the 2010 season Homma was selected as the new captain of Albirex Niigata.  However, his opportunity to play decreased behind Léo Silva and Yuki Kobayashi in 2013 and he did not play at all in 2014.

In August 2014, he moved to the J2 club Tochigi SC. He played as a regular player as defensive midfielder. However the club finished in last place in 2015 and was relegated to the J3 League in 2016. In 2016, although he played as a regular player and the club won second place, the club lost in the promotion playoffs and was not promoted to J2. In 2017, he moved to Albirex Niigata. He retired at the end of the 2017 season.

Club statistics

Honors
J2 League (1): 2003

References

External links

1981 births
Living people
Association football people from Niigata Prefecture
Japanese footballers
J1 League players
J2 League players
J3 League players
Albirex Niigata players
Tochigi SC players
Association football midfielders